= Motive for Murder (film) =

2026 Hindi-language film

Motive For Murder
- Directed by: Mohan Vadlapatla
- Written by: Mohan Vadlapatla; Jo Sharma USA; Rahul Adabala
- Screenplay by: Mohan Vadlapatla
- Story by: Mohan Vadlapatla
- Produced by: Mohan Vadlapatla
- Starring: Jo Sharma; Sambeet Acharya
- Cinematography: Santosh Shanamoni
- Music by: Vasanth Isaipettai
- Production companies: Mohan Media Creations; Jo Sharma's McwinGroup USA
- Distributed by: PVR Inox India; JVEL; TekFlix USA
- Release date: May 8, 2026 (India)
- Country: India
- Languages: Telugu; Hindi

Motive For Murder (also known as M4M – Motive For Murder) is a 2026 Indian psychological crime thriller film directed and produced by Mohan Vadlapatla. The film stars Jo Sharma and Sambeet Acharya in pivotal roles. The film marked the Indian cinema debut of American actress Jo Sharma. The film is set in Hyderabad and follows the investigation of a serial killer who recreates famous paintings through brutal murders. ACP Krishna and investigative journalist Radha become involved in unraveling the mystery as clues lead them toward a former student and a school principal connected to the crimes.

== Cast ==
- Jo Sharma as Radha
- Sambeet Acharya as ACP Krishna
- Subhaleka Sudhakar
- Satya Krishnan
- Pasunoori Srinivas
- Geetha Bhaskar

== Production ==
The film was directed by Mohan Vadlapatla, who also co-wrote the story along with Jo Sharma USA and Rahul Adabala. The cinematography was handled by Santosh Shanamoni, while music was composed by Vasanth Isaipettai.

== Reception ==
The film received attention for its suspense-filled screenplay, stylish presentation and performances. Jo Sharma's portrayal of investigative journalist Radha was particularly noted in several reviews covering the film's release.
